is a Japanese women's professional shogi player ranked 1-kyū. She is a member of the Ladies Professional Shogi-players' Association of Japan.

Promotion history
Tanaka's promotion history is as follows.

 3-kyū: June 2018
 2-kyū: September 1, 2021
 1-kyū: July 11, 2022

Note: All ranks are women's professional ranks.

References

1994 births
Living people
Japanese shogi players
Women's professional shogi players
Professional shogi players from Ishikawa Prefecture
LPSA